Eta College is an international, private, single purpose college founded in 1983. It has nine campuses, and an online learning facility. The national office is located in Cape Town. Its purpose is to provide education for fitness sport and recreation needs. The language of instruction is English.

History 

Eta College was initiated as Exercise Teachers Academy in 1983 by Professor Tim Noakes, Malcolm Marrisson, Rob Cowling and Linda Halliday to meet the education needs of the fast developing health and fitness industry at that time. During this time, it was run by Malcolm Marrisson and for several years mentored by Professor Tim Noakes. In 1994 the two current directors, Linda Halliday and Dr Steve Harris took over the Exercise Teachers Academy and began to grow it as a college. Since the early nineties, the college has developed into a highly respected national education provider, offering occupationally based learning towards registered qualifications.

At the time that the new Eta College was emerging, new legislation and regulations that governed South African education were brought about. These regulatory changes have had a big impact on education in sport and have brought with them greater demands for rigorous quality assurance in education.

Campus 

The head office or Centre for Academic Development (CAD) is based at the Western Province Cricket Club in Rondebosch. This campus hosts classes for full-time courses as well as part-time courses.  The Distance Learning office, as well as the Special Projects office are located here.
Other campuses exist in:
Bloemfontein
Durban
Dubai
George
Johannesburg
Mauritius
Pretoria
Stellenbosch
Port Elizabeth, Eastern Cape

Courses 
Diploma in Coaching Science
Diploma in Fitness Studies
Diploma in Sports Management
Certificate in Coaching Science
Certificate in Fitness Studies
Certificate in Sports Management

Online/distance learning 
The eta College offers an online learning program that can be completed anywhere in the world.

Students and staff 
, over 3500 students were enrolled in eta College courses around the world. The ratio between male and female students is approximately 60/40. There have been over 5000 students enrolled in full-time, part-time and short course education at the college over the past 10 years.

eta College employs approximately 60 staff members including facilitators, administrative and academic staff.

Affiliations 
eta College is a member of the Cape Higher Education Consortium, DHET, REPPSA, SSISA, APPETD, CATHSSETA, ETDPSETA, and affiliated to College SA, Blue Bulls Rugby Union, Stellenbosch Rugby Academy, WPCC, JR School Mauritius, Core Direction Dubai and Virgin Active.

Notable alumni 
Olympic Gold medalist swimmer, Natalie Du Toit
Ex-Sharks Captain & Springbok Rugby Player, Keegan Daniel 
Current Sharks Rugby Player, Sbu’ Sithole
1995 Springbok and World Cup winner, Chester Williams
Former Bafana Bafana coach, Gordon Igesund

Notable projects 
Sponsor of the SSISA Youth Talent Identity and Development Conference

See also 
 List of universities in South Africa
 Education in South Africa

References

External links 
  

Colleges in South Africa
1983 establishments in South Africa
Educational institutions established in 1983